Nobuea kurodai is a species of tropical land snail  with an operculum, a terrestrial gastropod mollusk in the family Cyclophoridae. 
This species is endemic to Japan.

References

Further reading 
  Minato H. & Nishi K. (1996). "宮崎県で採集されたニッポンノブエガイ A Note on Second Occurrence of Nobuea kurodai (Mesogastropoda: Cyclophoridae) from Miyazaki-ken". ちりぼたん 27(1): 14-15. CiNii.
  Nobuea kurodai. Japanese Red Data book.

Cyclophoridae
Gastropods described in 1978
Taxonomy articles created by Polbot